Lihir can refer to:
 Lihir Group, an island group in Papua New Guinea
 Lihir Island, the main island in the group
 Lihir language, an Austronesian language spoken in the Lihir island group
 Lihir Gold, a gold mining company